Ba Qala Dun (also Romanized as Bā Qalā Dūn; also known as Bā Qaleh Dān) is a village in Bahmayi-ye Sarhadi-ye Sharqi Rural District, Dishmok District, Kohgiluyeh County, Kohgiluyeh and Boyer-Ahmad Province, Iran. At the 2006 census, its population was 231, in 52 families.

References 

Populated places in Kohgiluyeh County